Virendra Kumar Baranwal is an Indian poet and writer. He was awarded by Mahapandit Rahul Sankrityayan Award in 2004 for his work Jinna: Ek Punardrishti.

Personal life
Baranwal was born on 21 September 1941 to Dayaram Baranwal and his wife Gayatri Devi in the village of Phoolpur in Azamgarh district in Uttar Pradesh. His father was a Freedom fighter. He acquired B.A., M.A. degrees from Banaras Hindu University. Further he did his LL.B. degree from Bhopal University.

Baranwal retired from the post of Chief Commissioner of Income Tax in the Indian Revenue Service from 1969 to 2005, teaching English language and literature for a few years. Baranwal has a keen interest in Hindi, Urdu, English, Sanskrit and comparative literature as well as on literary literature, black and red Indian literature, and the discourse of Indian renaissance and freedom struggle.

Published work
Barnwal has published many works, but Jinna: Ek Punardrishti is his most well known.

 Paani Ke Chhite Suraj ke Chehre
 Vole Shoyinka ki Kavitayen
 Pahal
 Rakt mein Yatra
 Tanav
 Machi Tawara ki Kavitayen
 Jinna : Ek Punardrishti
 Woh Pahla Nakhuda Hindustani ke Safine
 Hind Swaraj : Nav Sabhyata Vimars
 Ratanbai Jinna
 Muslim Navjagaran aur Akbar Ilahbaadia ka Gandhinama

Awards
 Mahapandit Rahul Sankrityayan Award - 2004

References

Hindi-language poets
Living people
1941 births
Hindi-language writers
Poets from Uttar Pradesh